Carpobrotus modestus, commonly known as inland pigface, is a succulent perennial of the family Aizoaceae, native to the coasts of Australia. It produces purple flowers which mature into fruits and is mainly used as a groundcover succulent or as a drought tolerant plant.

Distribution
Carpobrotus modestus is situated in heath, shrubland, and woodland areas with clayey-sand. It is recorded in Walpole-Nornalup National Park. The distribution can reach all the way north of Kalbarri, east to Eyre and inland to Newdegate in Western Australia. It is also found around the South Australian-Victorian border.

Carpobrotus edulis, also a member of the genus Carpobrotus, is a succulent native to South Africa. In the past, it was most often used as an ornamental plant. One common use for these succulents was to plant them along roadsides. However, it has spread to become invasive. The effects of this invasive species are to smother and reduce the regeneration of native flora. In addition, invasion of the species edulis causes changes to soil pH and the nutrient composition.   
Other species in the Carpobrotus genus are also capable of invading a large range of habitats. The expansion of the Carpobrotus species in the Mediterranean Basin has made such a large impact on the native flora that the group is on a black list of the twelve most invasive plants in the region.

Habitat and ecology
The Inland Pigface is a perennial succulent that is found in coasts, plains, and dunes near the coast. It can be found in areas of Western Australia, Southern Australia and certain areas of Victoria. It is also found in areas of low rainfall. The species flourish in all forms of soil which include sandy, loamy, and clay. Although the habitat plays a large part in a plant's growth and development, the inland pigface can grow in acidic, basic, and neutral soil pHs that are well-drained. In these tough environments, the Inland Pigface can tolerate harsh habitual influences such as droughts, frost, and salinity in the soil (since it can grow in coastal areas which are close to the ocean). The Inland Pigface is a perennial and flowers during the southern summer and winter.

In a study done testing the effects of severe drought on the growth, water usage, and survival of several plants, including the Carpobrotus Modestus, it was shown that high water use by C.modestus resulted in reduced survival relative to the other plants tested. It was also shown that the modestus species lost shoot biomass over the drought period.

Carpobrotus Modestus is a species that behaves as a post-fire pioneer. In a study done to observe this behavior, it was shown that in a semi-arid area composed of tall shrublands, with a range of different fire patterns, the modestus populations appeared immediately in the post fire period. Then, within 7 years they matured and died as the shrubland regenerated and grew taller and denser.

Morphology

Carpobrotus modestus has thick fleshy leaves since it is a perennial succulent. Leaves are usually around 3–7 cm and curve in a triangular shape towards the tip. Near the points of the leaves are usually tinted pink, but occasionally have a bluish hue to it. The flowers are open-petalled once they bloom outwards in a linear direction. The petals are purple and are almost shaped like sunflower petals, but much narrower. These petals surround the stamen scattered inside which are thin, light yellow, and shaped like the letter 'T'. Species contain both male and female reproductive organs (hermaphrodite.) 

The habit of Carpobrotus modestus is prostrate and spreading. A prostrate plant has stems that grow parallel to the soil, so the surface of the plant appears to be flat and sprawling. The growth of C.modestus gives the appearance of a form of flat “cover” on the ground.

In the fruiting stage of C.modestus, the bulb is surrounded by the thick three-edged leaves that surround it. The fruit is egg-shaped, and as it develops, pushes the thick leaves outwards and has petals sprout out of it.

The Carpobrotus Modestus is an Australian succulent that switches between CAM and  photosynthesis. When soil water is limited, the plant uses CAM photosynthesis with dark  fixation and switches to  photosynthesis when water is available again. 

Like the C.modestus, its relatives chilensis (sea-fig) and edulis (iceplant) both have similar abilities to thrive in harsh environments. The chilensis and edulis are generally situated in dunes, coastal areas, and grassland.

These Carpobrotus plants are also desired for gardening because of its tolerance to poor soils and lack of need for water. Propagation of carpobrotus plants can be done by splitting the stems or spreading its seeds. However, once it is in soil that is constantly dry, it can become invasive. In California, the relatives of Modestus; chilensis and edulis are both considered invasive species.

A study was done to examine the impact Carpobrotus edulis have on native plants and how invasive this species actually is. From the ramets to the seeds, C. edulis manages to prevent the germination, growth and survival of the two native species (Malcolmia littorea and Scabiosa atropurpurea.) Study found no competition between C. edulis and the native plants. In contrast, the invasive species have negative effects on the native plant's developmental stages and overall shortened their lifespan.

Flowers and fruit
The flowers of Carpobrotus modestus grow to be about  when they are fully open. The Inland Pigface flowers in spring/summer with light purple petals that transition to white at their bases. The fruit it produces is fleshy, purple when ripe, and appears fig-like about 15–20 mm long with a recurved stalk. It is erected with sepals as long as the fruit.

Food
Both the fruit and leaves of Carpobrotus modestus were once used by indigenous people in Australia as a source of food, whether it be raw or cooked. The fig-like fruit produced by the plant is edible.

Medicinal
No medicinal uses for Carpobrotus modestus yet. However, the genus plant of Carpobrotus leaf juice is used to treat mild astringent and jellyfish sting. The use of the leaf juice with water can treat diarrhea and stomach cramps. The external usage will also be used for mosquito bites and sunburn. It has been shown that the flower can also be used to treat constipation and used as a laxative.

References

modestus
Renosterveld